John Charles Abrams (born 10 September 1934) is a former New Zealand field hockey player.

Playing career
He represented New Zealand in field hockey between 1956 and 1963, winning 15 caps, including at the 1956 Olympic Games in Melbourne and 1960 Olympic Games in Rome.

References

External links

1934 births
Living people
Field hockey players from Christchurch
New Zealand male field hockey players
Olympic field hockey players of New Zealand
Field hockey players at the 1956 Summer Olympics
Field hockey players at the 1960 Summer Olympics